RUC may refer to:
  or Coimbra University Radio, a Portuguese university station 
 Rapid Update Cycle, an atmospheric prediction system
 Renmin University of China, Beijing
 Road User Charges (RUC), taxes payable in New Zealand
 Roskilde University or Roskilde Universitetscenter
 Royal Ulster Constabulary, the police force in Northern Ireland from 1922 to 2001
 Specialty Society Relative Value Scale Update Committee, for US healthcare pricing

Ruc may refer to:
 Chut language in Vietnam, also known as Ruc or Ruc-Sach
 Rục people